András Jancsó (born 22 April 1996) is a Hungarian football player who plays for Szentlőrinc.

Club statistics

Updated to games played as of 8 December 2018.

References
 HLSZ
 MLSZ
 

1996 births
Living people
Sportspeople from Szombathely
Hungarian footballers
Hungary youth international footballers
Hungary under-21 international footballers
Association football midfielders
Szombathelyi Haladás footballers
Soproni VSE players
Gyirmót FC Győr players
Szentlőrinci SE footballers
Nemzeti Bajnokság I players
Nemzeti Bajnokság II players
21st-century Hungarian people